Alex A. Deccio (October 28, 1921 – October 25, 2011) was an American politician.

Born in Walla Walla, Washington, Deccio served in the United States Army Air Forces during World War II. He owned an insurance business in  Yakima, Washington. Deccio served in the Washington House of Representatives 1975-1980 and then in the Washington State Senate. He also served as Yakima County, Washington commissioner.

Awards 
 2002 Ted Robertson Community Service Award. Presented by Greater Yakima Chamber of Commerce.

Personal life 
On February 22, 1946, Deccio married Lucille Pauline Dexter (1922-2017). They have eight children. Deccio and his family live in Yakima, Washington.

On October 25, 2011, Deccio died in Yakima, Washington. He was 89 years old.

References

External links 
 Alex Deccio at digitalarchives.wa.gov
 Alex A. Deccio at ourcampaigns.com

1921 births
2011 deaths
Politicians from Walla Walla, Washington
Politicians from Yakima, Washington
Military personnel from Washington (state)
United States Army Air Forces soldiers
Businesspeople from Washington (state)
County commissioners in Washington (state)
Members of the Washington House of Representatives
Washington (state) state senators
20th-century American businesspeople
United States Army Air Forces personnel of World War II